These page shows the results of the inaugural Men's Beach Volleyball Tournament at the 1996 Summer Olympics in Atlanta. The Olympic Beach Volleyball competition took place in Atlanta Beach from July 23 to July 28 in a 10.000-seat stadium.

Results

Winner's Bracket, First-round
 Palinek/Pakosta, Czech Republic (16) def. Yuste/Prieto, Spain (17), 15-11 (27 minutes)
 Bosma/Jimenez, Spain (9) def. Nurmufid/Markoji, Indonesia (24), 15-7 (41)
 Penigaud/Jodard, France (12) def. Keel/Kreen, Estonia (21), 15-8 (48)
 Prosser/Zahner, Australia (13) def. Drakich/Dunn, Canada (20), 15-6 (35)
 Ghiurghi/Grigolo, Italy (14) def. Hamilton/Hamilton, New Zealand (19), 15-8 (39)
 Ahmann/Hager, Germany (11) def. Takao/Setoyama, Japan (22), 15-8 (51)
 Alvarez/Rosell, Cuba (10) def. Englen/Petersson, Sweden (23), 15-3 (29)
 Maia/Brenha, Portugal (18) def. Everaert/Mulder, Netherlands (15), 15-8 (51)

Winner's Bracket, Second-round
 Roberto Lopes/Franco, Brazil (1) def. Palinek/Pakosta, Czech Republic (16), 15-5 (34)
 Bosma/Jimenez, Spain (9) def. Child/Heese, Canada (8), 15-1 (31)
 Zé Marco/Emanuel, Brazil (5) def. Penigaud/Jodard, France (12), 15-1 (27)
 Dodd/Whitmarsh, United States (4) def. Prosser/Zahner, Australia (13), 15-10 (49)
 Kiraly/Steffes, United States (3) def. Ghiurghi/Grigolo, Italy (14), 15-7 (36)
 Ahmann/Hager, Germany (11) def. Kvalheim/Maaseide, Norway (6), 17-16 (67)
 Alvarez/Rosell, Cuba (10) def. Conde/Martinez, Argentina (7), 15-11 (41)
 Smith/Henkel, United States (2) def. Maia/Brenha, Portugal (18), 15-7 (36)

Winner's Bracket, Third-round
 Bosma/Jimenez, Spain (9) def. Roberto Lopes/Franco, Brazil (1), 15-9 (71)
 Dodd-Whitmarsh, United States (4) def. Zé Marco/Emanuel, Brazil (5), 15-9 (44)
 Kiraly/Steffes, United States (3) def. Ahmann/Hager, Germany (11), 15-5 (32)
 Smith/Henkel, United States (2) def. Alvarez/Rosell, Cuba (10), 15-13 (52)

Winner's Bracket, Fourth-round
 Dodd/Whitmarsh, United States (4) def. Bosma/Jimenez, Spain (9), 15-6 (30)
 Kiraly/Steffes, United States (3) def. Smith/Henkel, United States (2), 17-15 (54)

Loser's Bracket, First-round (losers eliminated, place 17th)
 Palinek/Pakosta, Czech Republic (16) def. Everaert/Mulder, Netherlands (15), 15-6 (35)
 Child/Heese, Canada (8) def. Englen/Petersson, Sweden (23), 15-2 (28)
 Penigaud/Jodard, France (12) def. Takao/Setoyama, Japan (22), 15-12 (47)
 Prosser/Zahner, Australia (13) def. Hamilton/Hamilton New Zealand (19), 15-8 (38)
 Ghiurghi/Grigolo, Italy (14) def. Drakich/Dunn, Canada (20), 15-8 (45)
 Kvalheim/Maaseide, Norway (6) def. Keel/Kreen, Estonia (21), 15-2 (31)
 Conde/Martinez, Argentina (7) def. Nurmufid/Markoji, Indonesia (24), 15-5 (35)
 Maia/Brenha, Portugal (18) def. Yuste/Prieto, Spain (17), 15-8 (49)

Loser's Bracket, Second-round (losers eliminated, place 13th)
 Maia/Brenha, Porgtual (18) def. Conde/Martinez, Argentina (7), 15-5 (35)
 Kvalheim/Maaseide, Norway (6) def. Ghiurghi/Grigolo, Italy (14), 15-11 (43)
 Prosser/Zahner, Australia (13) def. Penigaud/Jodard, France (12), 15-13 (52)
 Child/Heese, Canada (8) def. Palinek/Pakosta, Czech Republic (16), 15-9 (46)

Loser's Bracket, Third-round (losers eliminated, place ninth)
 Maia/Brenha, Portugal (18) def. Zé Marco/Emanuel, Brazil (5), 15-12 (54)
 Kvalheim/Maaseide, Norway (6) def. Franco/Roberto Lopes, Brazil (1), 15-10 (51)
 Alvarez/Rosell, Cuba (10) def. Prosser/Zahner, Australia (13), 15-6 (35)
 Child/Heese, Canada (8) def. Ahmann/Hager, Germany (11), 15-7 (42)

Loser's Bracket, Fourth-round (losers eliminated, place seventh)
 Maia/Brenha, Portugal (18) def. Kvalheim/Maaseide, Norway (6), 15-3 (28)
 Child/Heese, Canada (8) def. Alvarez/Rosell, Cuba (10), 15-4 (30)

Loser's Bracket, Fifth-round (losers eliminated, place fifth)
 Maia/Brenha, Portugal (18) def. Smith/Henkel, United States (2), 15-13 (70)
 Child/Heese, Canada (8) def. Bosma/Jimenez, Spain (9), 15-4 (32)

Semi-finals
 Dodd/Whitmarsh, United States (4) def. Maia/Brenha, Portugal (18), 15-13 (65)
 Kiraly/Steffes, United States (3) def. Child/Heese, Canada (8), 15-11 (40)

Bronze medal match
 Child/Heese, Canada (8) def. Maia/Brenha, Portugal (18), 12-5 and 12-8 (77)

Gold Medal match
 Kiraly/Steffes, USA (3) def. Dodd/Whitmarsh, USA (4), 12-5 and 12-8 (62)

Final round

Final ranking

See also
Women's Beach Volleyball Tournament
Volleyball at the Summer Olympics

References
Beach Volleyball Results

O
Volleyball at the 1996 Summer Olympics
1996
Men's events at the 1996 Summer Olympics